Novo Oriente de Minas is a municipality in the northeast of the Brazilian state of Minas Gerais.  the population was 10,778 in a total area of . It became a municipality in 1997. The postal code (CEP) is 39817-000.

Novo Oriente de Minas is part of the statistical microregion of Teófilo Otoni.

This is one of the poorest municipalities in the state and in the country. The main economic activities are cattle raising (13,000 head in 2006) and farming with modest production of coffee, sugarcane, and bananas. Cropland made up . There were only five tractors. In the urban area there were no financial institutions . There were 125 automobiles, giving a ratio of about one automobile for every 80 inhabitants. Health care was provided by four public health clinics. There were no hospitals.

Municipal Human Development Index
MHDI: .582 (2000)
State ranking: 847 out of 853 municipalities
National ranking: 4,942 out of 5,138 municipalities
Life expectancy: 62
Literacy rate: 57 
Combined primary, secondary and tertiary gross enrolment ratio: .696
Per capita income (monthly): R$80.07

See also
List of municipalities in Minas Gerais

References

IBGE

Municipalities in Minas Gerais